Susan Powell (born ) is a broadcast meteorologist for the BBC. She broadcasts on the BBC News Channel, BBC One, BBC World, BBC Radio Four, and she is a main weather reporter on the BBC Six O'Clock News and BBC Radio Five Live. She was previously a main weather reporter on the BBC Ten O'Clock News.

Early life and education 
Powell grew up in the village of Wellington in Herefordshire, where she attended Aylestone High School and Hereford Sixth Form College. She studied chemistry at the University of Swansea. She stayed on to complete a doctorate in engineering with the support of the steelmaker Corus. Following this she did much travelling on the job, going to South Africa, Australia, Fiji, New Zealand, and the United States. In her travels she went skiing, swam with sharks, went diving and met friends. On her return she worked for Corus before joining the Met Office as a trainee broadcast meteorologist.

Broadcasting career
Following intensive training she joined the BBC Weather Centre in April 2001, presenting her first telecast in November 2001.

References

External links
Susan Powell Profile BBC Weather Website

Powell, Susan
BBC World News
Living people
Alumni of Swansea University
Year of birth missing (living people)